The BN-800 reactor (Russian: реактор БН–800) is a sodium-cooled fast breeder reactor, built at the Beloyarsk Nuclear Power Station, in Zarechny, Sverdlovsk Oblast, Russia. 
The reactor is designed to generate 880 MW of electrical power. 
The plant was considered part of the weapons-grade Plutonium Management and Disposition Agreement signed between the United States and Russia, with the reactor being part of the final step for a plutonium-burner core (a core designed to burn and, in the process, destroy, and recover energy from, plutonium) 
The plant reached its full power production in August 2016. According to Russian business journal Kommersant, the BN-800 project cost 140.6 billion rubles (roughly 2.17 billion dollars).

Design
The plant is a pool-type LMFBR, in which the reactor, coolant pumps, intermediate heat exchangers and associated piping are all located in a common liquid sodium pool. This is essentially the same general design as EBR-II, which entered service in 1963. The design of this plant was started in 1983 and was completely revised in 1987 after the Chernobyl disaster and to a somewhat lesser degree in 1993, according to the new safety guidelines. After the second revision, the electric output power was increased by 10 % to 880 MW due to the increased efficiency of the planned power generator steam turbines.

The reactor core is, in size and mechanical properties, very similar to the BN-600 reactor core, but the fuel composition is very different. While BN-600 uses medium-enriched uranium dioxide, this plant burns mixed uranium-plutonium fuel, helping to reduce the weapon-grade plutonium stockpile and provide information about the functioning of the closed uranium-plutonium fuel cycle. It was highlighted that the closed cycle will not require plutonium separation or other chemical processing.

The unit employs a three-circuit coolant arrangement; sodium coolant circulates in both the primary and secondary circuits. Water and steam flow in the third circuit. This heat is transferred from the reactor core via several independent circulation loops. Each comprises a primary sodium pump, two intermediate heat exchangers, a secondary sodium pump with an expansion tank located upstream, and an emergency pressure discharge tank. These feed a steam generator, which in turn supplies a condensing turbine that turns the generator.

Many infrastructure facilities were designed to accommodate both the BN-800 and a proposed follow on BN-1200 reactor.

History
The construction of BN-800 started in 1983 as Unit 4 at the Beloyarsk nuclear power plant but was put on hold after the 1986 Chernobyl accident. It resumed in 2006 and BN-800 achieved minimum controlled power in 2014, but issues led to further fuel development work. On 31 July 2015, the unit achieved minimum controlled power again, at 0.13 % of rated power. Commercial operations was expected to start before the end of 2016, with a power rating of 789 MWe.
The reactor was connected to the electricity grid in February 2016 and achieved full power for the first time in August 2016. Commercial power production started on November 1, 2016.

With both the United States and Russia reaching an agreement in 2001 to render a joint 34 tons of weapons grade plutonium, into reactor grade plutonium alongside reaching the spent fuel standard, that is mixed with the other more highly radioactive products within spent fuel.

US president Barack Obama canceled construction of the agreement-supporting US MOX fuel fabrication facility in 2016, citing cost overruns and for financial reasons proposing instead that for the US share of plutonium, it be diluted with non-radioactive material and disposed in the underground WIPP facility. However, the dilution could be reversed, and the material reconverted into weapons-grade plutonium.

On October 3, 2016, Russian president Vladimir Putin ordered the agreement to be suspended because the US did not meet its obligations.

In January 2020 the reactor started commercial operation with the first batch of MOX reprocessed uranium-plutonium fuel.

Transmutation
The BN-800 could be used to close the fuel circle. The core load of 15 t material consists mostly of U-238 and about 20.5 % plutonium. This could be taken from processed old nuclear fuel rods.

See also

 Generation III reactor

References

''The content in this article is from the existing Russian and German Wikipedia equivalents.

External links
.  (The possible updated link Fast neutron reactors)
 - on OKBM Afrikantov official pdf

The BN-800 Fast Reactor – a Milestone on a Long Road

Liquid metal fast reactors
Nuclear power in Russia
Soviet inventions
1983 establishments in the Soviet Union